Umiam Lake (locally known as Dam sait) is a reservoir in the hills  north of Shillong in the state of Meghalaya, India. It was created by damming the Umiam River in the early 1960s. The principal catchment area of the lake and dam is spread over 225 square km.

History
Umiam Dam, which impounds the lake, was built by the Assam State Electricity Board in the early 1960s. The dam's original purpose was to store water for hydroelectric power generation. The Umiam Stage I powerhouse, north of the lake, has four 9-MW turbine-generators, which entered commercial operation in 1965. Umiam Stage I was the first reservoir-storage hydroelectric project commissioned in the northeastern region of India. (Umtru Hydroelectric Project, a run-of-river project with an original capacity of 8.4 MW, began operation in 1957.) Three more stages of the Umiam Project were subsequently built downstream.

Tourist destination
The lake serves as a major tourist attraction for the state of Meghalaya. It is also a popular destination for water sport and adventure facilities. Tourists visit this spot for kayaking, water cycling, scooting, and boating.

Ecological effect
Apart from storing water for electricity generation, the lake also provides numerous ecosystem services at micro, meso and macro levels. Downstream irrigation, fisheries, and drinking water cater to local anthropogenic needs.

Toxic threat and silting
Due to the rising population of Shillong upstream of the lake, the lake is starting to become highly polluted. Also, there is the heavy problem of silting. An estimated  of silt enters Umiam Lake every year. Causes range between upstream encroachments, deforestation, blockage of natural drainage systems, and unscientific mining et al. in the catchment area. Excessive silt load in the lake has lowered the storage.

Gallery

References

External links

Umiam lake faces toxic threat
Umiam Dam satellite map
Umiam Lake Details
Siltation and Pollution Contribute to Power Crisis in Shillong
Pollution of Umiam Lake

Lakes of Meghalaya
Reservoirs in India
East Khasi Hills district
Tourist attractions in Meghalaya